McArthur River Airport  is located  east of the McArthur River mine, Saskatchewan, Canada.

See also 
 List of airports in Saskatchewan

References 

Registered aerodromes in Saskatchewan